Joseph F. Andrea (November 29, 1927 – December 5, 2002) was a member of the Wisconsin State Senate and the Wisconsin State Assembly.

Biography
Andrea was born on November 29, 1927. He graduated from Mary D. Bradford High School in Kenosha, Wisconsin served in the United States Navy during World War II. Andrea was later Constable of Kenosha from 1966 to 1968. A Roman Catholic, She was a member of the Catholic Youth Organization and the Society of the Holy Name. He was married to Olivia in 1952 and had four children, a daughter and three sons. Andrea died on December 5, 2002 at his home in Kenosha.

Political career
Andrea was a supervisor of Kenosha County, Wisconsin from 1968 to 1977. He was a member of the Assembly from 1976 to 1984 before serving in the Senate from 1985 to 1997. Andrea was a Democrat.

References

Politicians from Kenosha, Wisconsin
County supervisors in Wisconsin
Democratic Party Wisconsin state senators
Democratic Party members of the Wisconsin State Assembly
Military personnel from Wisconsin
United States Navy personnel of World War II
1927 births
2002 deaths
20th-century American politicians
Mary D. Bradford High School alumni